Sir Charles Noble Arden-Clarke  (25 July 1898 – 16 December 1962) was a British colonial administrator.

Biography 
Arden-Clarke was educated at Rossall School. He was the Resident Commissioner of the Bechuanaland Protectorate (later Botswana) between 1937 and 1942, a time at which the ruling regent Tshekedi Khama was in violent conflict with the British authorities. He was the Resident Commissioner of Basutoland from August 1942 to November 1946, and in 1946 was appointed as the first Governor of the newly created British Crown Colony of Sarawak, which was ceded in 1946 by the Kingdom of Sarawak. During his governorship in Sarawak he was despised by locals as, upon his appointment, Sarawak was engulfed with the Anti-cession Movement, which led to the assassination of his successor, Duncan Stewart in 1949 by the radical members of the Anti-cession movement. 

On 1 May 1948, he assumed the position of High Commissioner to Brunei. Documents were neither signed nor exchanged between Arden-Clarke and Anthony Abell, only the reading of the appointment for him was made in front of Brunei dignitaries in the State Court House. He promised the people of Brunei that it was his duty and responsibility to protect the interests and welfare of Brunei and its inhabitants and to contribute to its future development and progress. He was replaced by C.W. Dawson in October 1949.

After Sarawak, he was the last governor of the Gold Coast (later Ghana), from August 1949 until 1957, taking up residence in Fort Christiansborg. On 12 February 1951, he authorised Kwame Nkrumah's release from imprisonment in James Fort. After independence, he was named the first Governor-General of Ghana in 1957. Arden-Clarke's acceptance of the Africans and his attitude towards Kwame Nkrumah likely contributed to Ghana's relatively smooth transition to independence.

References

Archives
Papers of Charles Arden-Clarke  giving an insight into events during the transition of the Gold Coast to independent Ghana (1949-1957) are held by SOAS Special Collections

Colonial Administrative Service officers
Commissioners of the Bechuanaland Protectorate
Governors of the Gold Coast (British colony)
Governors of Sarawak
Governors-General of Ghana
1898 births
1962 deaths
Knights Grand Cross of the Order of St Michael and St George
People educated at Rossall School
Basutoland in World War II
Bechuanaland in World War II
1930s in Bechuanaland Protectorate
1940s in Bechuanaland Protectorate